Serge Pun & Associates (also SPA Group) is a major Myanmar-based conglomerate, engaged in 8 core sectors with 25 subsidiaries, involved in automobiles, real estate, retail, luxury tourism, agriculture and financial services. Its flagship company, First Myanmar International (FMI), was established in 1992 as one of Myanmar's first publicly traded companies.

SPA Group was founded by Serge Pun, a Sino-Burmese, in Hong Kong in 1983 as an investment holding and operating company. The company was registered in Myanmar in 1991.

Subsidiaries
First Myanmar Investment
Yoma Bank
FMI Air
SPA Motors
Successful Goal Trading
Convenience Prosperity Company
Yoma Yarza Manufacturing
Pun Hlaing International Hospital
Pun Hlaing International School
JJ-PUN Trading Company Limited

References

Conglomerate companies of Myanmar
Agriculture companies of Myanmar
Manufacturing companies of Myanmar
Holding companies established in 1983
1983 establishments in Burma
Companies based in Yangon